Nicholas "Nick" Hoag  (born 19 August 1992) is a Canadian male volleyball player. He is a member of the Canada men's national volleyball team, a participant in the 2016 Summer Olympics, a gold and silver medallist at the NORCECA Men's Volleyball Championship in 2015 and 2013, and a bronze medallist at the 2015 Pan American Games.

Personal life
Nick Hoag was born in Gatineau, Quebec to parents Glenn Hoag and Donna Kastelic. His parents both played for the Canadian national volleyball team, with his father Glenn the current coach of the men's national team. Nick's older brother Christopher is also a member of the men's national volleyball program.

Career

Club
Nick Hoag began his post high-school career by training at the Team Canada Full-time Training Center. In 2013, Nick joined French club Tours VB. Over the two years Nick spent there, he helped the team win both the French Cup and the French League in both seasons. Nick left the club to join Paris Volley for the 2015-16 season. He helped the team win the French League for the 9th time in the club's history.

For the 2016-17 season, Nick signed with Italian club Power Volley Milano. Now he is playing 2020-21 season for Fenerbahce Hdi Sigorta Turkish club.

National team
Nick was a member of the Canada men's junior national volleyball team from 2010 to 2011. He helped the team finish second at the 2010 Junior NORCECA Championship, and finish 11th at the 2011 U21 World Championship. Nick also helped the team finish 5th at the 2013 Universiade.

Nick joined the Senior men's national team in 2013. He was the youngest member of the squad that finished a national team record 7th at the 2014 FIVB Volleyball Men's World Championship. He helped the team win bronze at the 2015 Pan American Games, silver at the 2013 Men's NORCECA Volleyball Championship, and was the MVP of the 2015 Men's NORCECA Volleyball Championship, helping Canada win gold along the way.

Nick was a member of the squad that finished 5th at the 2016 Summer Olympics. In June 2021, Hoag was named to Canada's 2020 Olympic team.

Sporting achievements
 National championships
 2013/2014  French Cup, with Tours VB
 2013/2014  French Championship, with Tours VB
 2014/2015  French Supercup, with Tours VB
 2014/2015  French Cup, with Tours VB
 2014/2015  French Championship, with Tours VB
 2015/2016  French Championship, with Paris Volley
 2018/2019  Italian Cup, with Sir Safety Perugia
 2018/2019  Italian Championship, with Sir Safety Perugia
 2020/2021  Turkish Supercup, with Fenerbahçe_SK
 National team
 2010  Junior NORCECA Championship
 2011  U-21 Pan Am Cup
 2013  NORCECA Championship
 2015  Pan American Games
 2015  NORCECA Championship
 2017  FIVB World League

Individually
 2010: NORCECA Championship – Most Valuable Player
 2011: U-21 Pan Am Cup – Best Spiker
 2015: NORCECA Championship – Most Valuable Player
 2015: NORCECA Championship – Best Server

References

External links
 
 
 PlusLiga player profile
 Volleybox player profile

1992 births
Living people
Canadian men's volleyball players
Place of birth missing (living people)
Volleyball players at the 2015 Pan American Games
Pan American Games bronze medalists for Canada
Pan American Games medalists in volleyball
Sportspeople from Gatineau
Sportspeople from Sherbrooke
Volleyball players at the 2016 Summer Olympics
Olympic volleyball players of Canada
Canadian expatriate sportspeople in Poland
Expatriate volleyball players in Poland
Resovia (volleyball) players
Tours Volley-Ball players
Medalists at the 2015 Pan American Games
Volleyball players at the 2020 Summer Olympics
Outside hitters